The 1958 Morecambe and Lonsdale by-election was held on 6 November 1958.  It was held due to the elevation of the incumbent Conservative MP, Sir Ian Fraser, being elevated to a life peerage.  It was retained by the Conservative candidate Basil de Ferranti.

Result

References

By-elections to the Parliament of the United Kingdom in Lancashire constituencies
Morecambe and Lonsdale by-election
Morecambe and Lonsdale by-election
1950s in Lancashire